Muriel Dowding, Baroness Dowding (other married name Whiting; 22 March 1908 – 20 November 1993) was an English animal rights activist.

Biography

Lady Dowding was born in London, the daughter of John Angelo Albino (whose family came from the Province of Como, Italy) and his wife Hilda Gertrude Albino (née Barnes).

Like her second husband Hugh Dowding, 1st Baron Dowding, she was a vegetarian, an anti-vivisectionist, spiritualist and Theosophist.

Lady Dowding used her prominent social position to advance animal welfare. She hosted regular Sunday lunch parties introducing influential people to vegetarian food, and her house was always a sanctuary for animals in need. In 1959, she founded Beauty Without Cruelty (BWC) to highlight the suffering of animals. She won several awards from the Royal Society for the Prevention of Cruelty to Animals (RSPCA).

Lady Dowding died in 1993 and her ashes were buried with her second husband in Westminster Abbey.

Publications
The Psychic Life of Muriel, the Lady Dowding: An Autobiography (1980) [Foreword by Victor Goddard]

See also
 List of animal rights advocates

References

External links

Beauty Without Cruelty
Beauty Without Cruelty USA

1908 births
1993 deaths
Anti-vivisectionists
British vegetarianism activists
Burials at Westminster Abbey
English activists
English animal rights activists
English autobiographers
British baronesses
English women activists
English spiritualists
English Theosophists
Organization founders
Parapsychologists